

Ancient Greece

Roman Empire / Byzantine Empire

Ottoman Greece

Greek War of Independence (1821–1832)

First Balkan War

Second Balkan War

World War II

References

Greece
Massacres
 List
Massacres